Polzen Waterfalls is located within the Mole National Park in Ghana. It is a waterfall which flows throughout the year. It derives its source from the Konkori Escarpment. It is located in the Savannah region of Ghana.

Features 
It is surrounded by thick forest which forms as a canopy. It is a source of water for wildlife and provides a breeze at its base. The water moves gently into rocks. It joins the Polzen river at a distance of 500metres away. The Polzen waterfall is a water catchment area in the park which has been claimed to be developed in a waterfall downstream.

References 

Waterfalls of Ghana
Savannah Region (Ghana)